is a 1990 action video game published by Information Global Service (IGS) for the original Game Boy exclusively in Japan on October 12, 1990. It is the first Game Boy title to be published by that company.

Story
The Dortoise Troops have hidden the ten power-up parts throughout outer space so that Astro Rabby cannot really fly. His creator, Doc, wants Rabby to soar freely in the sky so he asks Rabby to retrieve these special parts from the Dortoise Troops.

Gameplay

The concept of Astro Rabby is that the player is a rabbit who has to travel through certain top-viewed levels with automatic scrolling. Since the number of usable platforms are severely limited in this game, learning to control the player's jumps becomes a primary asset. Landing on platforms causes the block to break due to the excess force that the player puts on it. Sometimes, power-ups are given that will extend the relatively short time limit that Astro Rabby offers.

A heart is needed in each level in order to progress to the next level; the game is an infinite loop without collecting it. Players have control of a gun with limited ammo. While the jumping height is very short when beginning the game, it becomes longer as the player collects the appropriate power-up item. Enemies can also be avoided in addition to being shot at; making the fantasy violence component in the game completely optional.

While larger platforms allow the player to jump farther, the use of power-ups can also improve the character's jumping ability to the player's advantage.

Reception
On release, Famitsu magazine scored the game a 20 out of 40. German video gaming magazine Power Play gave Astro Rabby a score of 44% (the equivalent to a letter grade of F) in their February 1991 issue.

References

External links
 Astro Rabby at MobyGames

1990 video games
Japan-exclusive video games
Single-player video games
Top-down video games
Game Boy games
Game Boy-only games
Information Global Service games
Video games about rabbits and hares
Video games developed in Japan